Stepanchuk is a surname. Notable people with the surname include:

Andrei Stepanchuk (born 1979), Belarusian race walker
Serhiy Stepanchuk (born 1987), Ukrainian footballer

See also